Maximilian Mikhailovich Pronichev (born 17 November 1997) is a German-Russian professional footballer who plays as a forward for 2. Liga club SV Horn.

Club career
He made his debut in the Russian Football National League for FC Zenit-2 Saint Petersburg on 11 July 2016 in a game against FC Sokol Saratov.

On 24 June 2021, he signed with Energie Cottbus.

On 1 July 2022, Pronichev signed a two-year deal with SV Horn in Austria.

Personal life
His father Mikhail Pronichev played in the Soviet Top League for FC Lokomotiv Moscow, and later in Germany for FC Berlin where Maximilian was born.

References

External links
 Profile by Russian Football National League
 

Living people
1997 births
Footballers from Berlin
Association football forwards
Russian footballers
Russia youth international footballers
Russia under-21 international footballers
Tennis Borussia Berlin players
Hertha BSC players
FC Zenit Saint Petersburg players
FC Zenit-2 Saint Petersburg players
FC Schalke 04 players
Hertha BSC II players
FC Erzgebirge Aue players
Hallescher FC players
Rot-Weiss Essen players
FC Energie Cottbus players
SV Horn players
3. Liga players
Regionalliga players
Russian Second League players
2. Liga (Austria) players
Russian expatriate footballers
Expatriate footballers in Austria
Russian expatriate sportspeople in Austria